The 2011 Copa do Brasil Finals was a two-legged Brazilian football that determinate the 2011 Copa do Brasil champion. It was played on June 1 and 8. It was contested by Vasco da Gama, the 3rd place in the CBF Club Ranking, and Coritiba, the 2010 Campeonato Paranaense winners.

Vasco won the finals on away goals rule.

Background

Vasco da Gama and Coritiba, two former Brazilian champions, were the last two champions of the Série B (Vasco da Gama in 2009, Coritiba in 2010) and were the "teams-sensation" of Brazilian football.

Vasco da Gama

Vasco da Gama, after a poor start in the Campeonato Carioca, has rebounded with the arrival of players like Diego Souza, Alecsandro, Bernardo, and especially the coming of the coach Ricardo Gomes, which along with players like Fernando Prass, Dedé, Anderson Martins, Felipe, Éder Luís, Eduardo Costa and Rômulo, not only reaching the Copa do Brasil finals, as well as the Taça Rio Final (on penalties being defeated by archrival, Flamengo).

Vasco da Gama had already played a final before: in 2006, the team lost the competition for his archrival, Flamengo. On this occasion the team cross-Maltin was defeated in both games: 2–0 in the first game and 1–0 in the second.

Coritiba

Coritiba already had an excellent stage for an undefeated title (Campeonato Paranaense) and a record winning streak unprecedented in football worldwide, getting into the Guinness Book: 24 wins, being broken in the second game of the quarter-final against Palmeiras. The young team led by players like Rafinha, Davi, Marcos Aurélio, Anderson Aquino and the coach Marcelo Oliveira, who continued the work of Ney Franco (who went to the Brazil U-20), charmed and surprised Brazil in the first half of 2011.

Before to that final, the Coritiba had never played a Copa do Brasil finals. His best result in the competition came in 1991, 2001 and 2009, when the team played in the semi-finals in this years.

Road to the Finals

First leg

Second leg

See also
2011 Campeonato Brasileiro Série A

External links
Official webpage 

2011
Copa do Brasil 2011
Copa do Brasil 2011
Copa do Brasil 2011